The Battle of Cantenna was one of the last battles of the Third Servile War, and took place in 71 BC near Cantenna, Lucania, about 5 km from Giungano. The slave army was annihalated by Crassus's legions. 

Crassus had built a 60 kilometer ditch and a wall along the istmus or Rhegium to trap Spartacus and his army. One night a big storm happend and Spartacus used this opportunity to escape north  with most of his army. Howewer a force of about 20 000 slaves remained behind under Gannicus and Castus. So Crassus decided to finish them first. He sent 2 legates to flank the rebels and distract them. When the force of a few thousand arrived they were surrounded by the rebels. The Romans fought bravely, desperatly trying to buy time for Crassus's main force to arrive. Soon after the main army arrived and suurounded the rebels, what followed was a slaughter in which most of the rebel army was  killed or imprisoned. 

After the battle Crassus moved north to confront the main rebel force under Spartacus.

References

Third Servile War
Cantenna
71 BC 
Cantenna
1st century BC in the Roman Republic
Cantenna
Cantenna
Lucania